West Vidette is a  mountain summit located three miles west of the crest of the Sierra Nevada mountain range, in the northeast corner of Tulare County in northern California. The John Muir Trail passes below the north aspect of this remote peak. The first ascent of the summit was made September 19, 1926, by Norman Clyde, who is credited with 130 first ascents, most of which were in the Sierra Nevada.

Etymology
Vidette is an alternative spelling of vedette, which is a mounted sentry for bringing information, giving signals, or warnings of danger, to a main body of troops. The pyramid-shaped East Vidette and West Vidette appear to stand guard above a valley, which inspired 
members of the Sierra Club to name them: "Two of these promontories, standing guard, as it were, the one at the entrance to the valley and the other just within it, form a striking pair, and we named them the Videttes."

Climate
According to the Köppen climate classification system, West Vidette is located in an alpine climate zone. Most weather fronts originate in the Pacific Ocean, and travel east toward the Sierra Nevada mountains. As fronts approach, they are forced upward by the peaks, causing them to drop their moisture in the form of rain or snowfall onto the range (orographic lift). Precipitation runoff from the mountain drains to Bubbs Creek which is a tributary of the South Fork Kings River.

Gallery

See also

 East Vidette
 List of mountain peaks of California

References

Mountains of Tulare County, California
Mountains of Kings Canyon National Park
North American 3000 m summits
Mountains of Northern California
Sierra Nevada (United States)